AC Herculis, is an RV Tauri variable and spectroscopic binary star in the constellation of Hercules.  It varies in brightness between apparent magnitudes 6.85 and 9.0.

AC Her is an RVa star, meaning it is an RV Tauri variable whose maximum and minimum magnitudes do not slowly vary over hundreds of days.  It also is a very clear example of a common type of RV Tauri light curve where the maximum following a deep minimum is brighter than the maximum following a shallow minimum.  In each period of 75.46 days it has two maxima and two minima.

AC Her is also a binary star, although the secondary can only be detected by its effect on the radial velocity of the primary.  The invisible secondary is more massive than the supergiant primary, so the primary moves at relatively high velocity in its three years and three months orbit.  The two stars are also surrounded by a dusty disc filling the region between 34 and 200 astronomical units (AU).

It is slightly cooler than the sun, although this varies by over a thousand K as the star pulsates.

References

External links
 AAVSO article

Hercules (constellation)
Herculis, AC
RV Tauri variables
F-type supergiants
090697
170756
BD+21 3459
IRAS catalogue objects
J18301623+2152007
Spectroscopic binaries